The 1939 Texas Tech Red Raiders football team represented Texas Technological College—now known as Texas Tech University—as a member of the Border Conference during the 1939 college football season. Led by tenth-year head coach Pete Cawthon, the Red Raiders compiled an overall record of 5–5–1 with a mark of 2–1 in conference play, placing third in the Border Conference. The team outscored its opponents by a total of 150 to 74 on the season. Texas Tech played home games at Tech Field in Lubbock, Texas.

On November 11, Texas Tech played Centenary to a scoreless tie in a game in which the two teams combined for an NCAA-record 77 punts.

Schedule

Game summaries

at Centenary

The game was played in a torrential downpour that led to muddy field conditions that prevented either team from effectively running or passing the ball. To cope with the poor conditions, the teams resorted to punting in hopes of recovering a turnover on the other end of the field. Both teams combined for 77 punts (39 for Texas Tech and 38 for Centenary), with 67 occurring on first down. 42 punts were returned, 19 went out of bounds, 10 were downed, 1 went into the end zone for a touchback, 4 were blocked, and 1 was fair caught. The Gentlemen managed to finish with 31 yards of total offense, while the Red Raiders finished with a one-yard loss. Texas Tech punter Charlie Calhoun punted the ball 36 times for 1,318 yards, both of which still stand as NCAA records.

References

Texas Tech
Texas Tech Red Raiders football seasons
Texas Tech Red Raiders football